The 1995 Central American and Caribbean Championships in Athletics were held at the Estadio La Pedrera in Guatemala City, Guatemala between 14–16 July.

Medal summary

Men's events

Women's events

A = affected by altitude

† = non-championship event

Medal table

External links
Men Results – GBR Athletics
Women Results – GBR Athletics

Central American and Caribbean Championships in Athletics
Central American and Caribbean Championships
Central
International athletics competitions hosted by Guatemala